Krystian Jan Sikorski (born April 14, 1961) is a former Polish ice hockey player. He played for the Poland men's national ice hockey team at the 1984 Winter Olympics in Sarajevo, and the 1988 Winter Olympics in Calgary.

References

1961 births
Living people
Ice hockey players at the 1984 Winter Olympics
Ice hockey players at the 1988 Winter Olympics
Olympic ice hockey players of Poland
Sportspeople from Bytom
Polish ice hockey left wingers